Tatoba (known as Tatova until 2000) is a village in the municipality of Osakücə in the Lankaran Rayon of Azerbaijan.

References

Populated places in Lankaran District